Amphitheater Mountain may refer to:

Amphitheater Mountain (Montana), in Glacier National Park
Amphitheater Mountain (Washington), in Pasayten Wilderness
Amphitheater Mountain (Wyoming), in Yellowstone National Park